The 1972–73 Illinois State Redbirds men's basketball team represented Illinois State University during the 1972–73 NCAA University Division men's basketball season. The Redbirds, led by third-year head coach Will Robinson, played their home games at Horton Field House in Normal, Illinois and competed as an independent (not a member of a conference). They finished the season 13–12.

Roster

Schedule

|-
!colspan=9 style=|Exhibition season

|-
!colspan=9 style=|Regular season

Source

References

Illinois State Redbirds men's basketball seasons
Illinois State
Illinois State Redbirds men's basketball
Illinois State Redbirds men's basketball